Yves Laferrière (1943 – December 11, 2020) was a Canadian musician and composer. He was a two-time Genie Award winner, for Best Original Song at the 6th Genie Awards in 1985 for "Touch Me", which he cowrote with Paule Baillargeon and Marjolène Morin for the film A Woman in Transit (La Femme de l'hôtel), and for Best Original Score at the 11th Genie Awards in 1990 for Jesus of Montreal (Jésus de Montréal).

Filmography

Composer
The Red Kitchen (La Cuisine rouge) - 1980
La Phonie furieuse - 1982
Lucien Brouillard - 1983
Just a Game (Rien qu'un jeu) - 1983
A Woman in Transit (La Femme de l'hôtel) - 1984
Like a Heartbreak (C'est comme une peine d'amour) - 1985
Sonia - 1986
Le Chemin de Damas - 1988
Jesus of Montreal (Jésus de Montréal) - 1989
White Is the Night (Blanche est la nuit) - 1989
Impasse de la vignette - 1990
Babylone - 1990
Moody Beach - 1990 
Solo - 1991
Montreal Stories (Montréal vu par...) - 1991
Kitty Cats - 1991
Le Complexe d'Édith - 1991
Between the Solitudes - 1992
The Sex of the Stars (Le sexe des étoiles) - 1993
Bandes-hommages 100 ans de cinéma - 1996
Poverty and Other Delights (Joyeux Calvaire) - 1996
The Secret Laughter of Women - 1999
Claude Jutra, portrait sur film - 2002
Plain Truth - 2004

Actor
Le Complexe d'Édith (Short, 1991)

References

External links

1943 births
2020 deaths
20th-century Canadian composers
21st-century Canadian composers
Canadian male composers
20th-century Canadian male musicians
21st-century Canadian male musicians
Best Original Song Genie and Canadian Screen Award winners
Best Original Score Genie and Canadian Screen Award winners
Canadian songwriters
Canadian film score composers